Vailati is a surname. Notable people with the surname include:

Germano Vailati (born 1980), Swiss footballer
Giovanni Vailati (1863–1909), Italian philosopher, historian of science, and mathematician
Giovanni Vailati (1815–1890), Italian mandolinist 

Italian-language surnames